Aline et Valcour; ou, Le Roman philosophique is an epistolary novel by the Marquis de Sade. It contrasts a brutal African kingdom, Butua, with a South Pacific island paradise known as Tamoé and led by the philosopher-king Zamé.

Sade wrote the book while incarcerated in the Bastille in the 1780s. Published in 1795, it was the first of Sade's books published under his true name.

Bibliography
The book was translated into English, German, Spanish and Japanese.

An essay titled "Observations on Aline and Valcour" by Alice Laborde appeared in the collection  Sade, his ethics and rhetoric by Colette Verger Michael, New York 1989.

Blank darkness: Africanist discourse in French by Christopher L Miller (Chicago 1985) contains a chapter titled "No one's novel: Sade's Aline et Valcour".

External links
Aline et Valcour, tome 1 (in French) from Project Gutenberg
Aline et Valcour, tome 2 (in French) from Project Gutenberg
Aline et Valcour, tome 3 (in French) from Project Gutenberg
Aline et Valcour, tome 4 (in French) from Project Gutenberg
 Aline et Valcour, ou le roman philosophique. Écrit à la Bastille un an avant la Révolution de France, vol. 1, vol. 2, vol. 3, vol. 4, a Paris, Chez la Veuve Girouard, Libraire maison Égalité, Galerie de Bois, n°. 196, 1795.
Aline and Valcour, Vols 1–3 (in English) from Contra Mundum Press, tr. by John Galbraith Simmons & Jocelyne Geneviève Barque

1790s fantasy novels
1795 novels
Epistolary novels
French erotic novels
Novels by the Marquis de Sade
Prison writings
Novels set in Africa
Novels set in Oceania
Novels set on islands